Parapythais melzeri is a species of beetle in the family Cerambycidae, and the only species in the genus Parapythais. It was described by Monné in 1980.

References

Compsosomatini
Beetles described in 1980
Monotypic beetle genera